Scleronema is a genus of South American flowering plant in the family Malvaceae. genus is accepted, and its native range is S. Tropical America.

References

Bombacoideae
Malvaceae genera